Francisco Norden (born 9 November 1929) is a Colombian film director, screenwriter, editor and producer born in Brussels from an Austrian father and a Colombian mother. He has directed eight films between 1963 and 2005. His film Cóndores no entierran todos los días was screened in the Un Certain Regard section at the 1984 Cannes Film Festival.

Filmography
 Las murallas de Cartagena (1963)
 Se llamaría Colombia (1970)
 Camilo, el cura guerrillero (1974)
 I villagi (1975)
 Congreso mundial de brujería (1975)
 Arte tairona (1977)
 Cóndores no entierran todos los días (1984)
 El trato (2005)

References

External links
  Biblioteca Luis Ángel Arango

1929 births
Living people
Colombian film directors
Colombian screenwriters
Male screenwriters
Colombian film editors
Colombian film producers
Colombian people of Austrian descent
Belgian people of Austrian descent
Belgian people of Colombian descent